Likhit Dhiravegin (11 May 1941 – 20 November 2016) was a Thai political scientist and politician.

References

External links

1941 births
2016 deaths
Likhit Dhiravegin
Likhit Dhiravegin
Likhit Dhiravegin
Likhit Dhiravegin